Hammonia was the name of a number of ships.

Hamburg Amerika Linie

 
 
 
 
(also )

Bauermann & Metzendorf
 

Ship names